Education in state institutions is at the initial, primary, secondary and tertiary levels and in the undergraduate university level (not for graduate programs). Private education is paid, although in some cases (especially in primary and secondary schools)  state subsidies support its costs. According to studies by UNESCO, education in Argentina and Uruguay guarantee equality to have institutional features that hinder the commercialization of education, as well as Finland has characteristics that favor multiethnic population education and special education, education favors Argentina equality. According to the last census, the illiteracy rate is 1.9%, the second lowest in Latin America. In the last decade, Argentina has created nine new universities, while the outflow of university students increased by 68%.

Education is a responsibility shared by the national government, the provinces and federal district and private institutions, though basic guidelines have historically been set by the Ministry of Education . Closely associated in Argentina with President Domingo Sarmiento's assertion that "the sovereign should be educated" ("sovereign" referring to the people), education has been extended nearly universally and its maintenance remains central to political and cultural debate. Even though education at all levels, including universities, has always been free, there are a significant number of private schools and universities.

History

The education in Argentina known as the Latin American docta has had a convoluted history. There was no effective education plan until President Domingo Sarmiento (1868–1874) placed emphasis on bringing Argentina up-to-date with practices in developed countries. Sarmiento encouraged the immigration and settling of European educators and built schools and public libraries throughout the country, in a programme that doubled the enrollment of students during his term; in Argentina, Teacher's Day (on September 11) commemorates his death. The first national laws mandating universal, compulsory, free and secular education (Law 1420 of Common Education) were sanctioned in 1884 during the administration of President Julio Roca. The non-religious character of this system, which forbade parochial schools from issuing official degrees directly but only through a public university, harmed the relations between the Argentine State and the Catholic Church, leading to resistance from the local clergy and a heated conflict with the Holy See (through the Papal Nuncio).

Following the University Reform of 1918, Argentine education, especially at university level, became more independent of the government, as well as the influential Catholic Church. The church began to re-emerge in country's secular education system during the administration Juan Perón, when in 1947, catechism was reintroduced in public schools, and parochial institutions began again receiving subsidies. A sudden reversal in the policy in 1954 helped lead to Perón's violent overthrow, after which his earlier, pro-clerical policies were reinstated by General Pedro Aramburu. Aramburu's Law 6403 of 1955, which advanced private education generally, and parochial, or more often, Catholic-run schools (those staffed with lay teachers), in particular, helped lead to the establishment of the Argentine Catholic University.

The program of deregulation and privatization pursued by President Carlos Menem in reaction to the country's socio-economic crisis of 1989 led to the decentralization of the Argentine secondary school system, whereby, from 1992 onward, the schools' administration and funding became a provincial responsibility. The policy's weakness, however, lay in that federal revenue sharing did not increase accordingly, particularly given the decision to shift two primary school years to the secondary system.

Real government spending on education increased steadily from the return of democratic rule in 1983 (with the exception of the crises in 1989 and 2002) and, in 2007, totaled over US$14 billion.

Achievements
In spite of its many problems, Argentina's higher education managed to reach worldwide levels of excellence in the 1960s. Up to 2013 Argentina educated five Nobel Prize winners, three in the sciences: Luis Federico Leloir, Bernardo Houssay and César Milstein and two in peace: Carlos Saavedra Lamas and Adolfo Pérez Esquivel, the highest number surpassing countries economically more developed and populated as Ireland or Spain. In addition, as of 2010, Argentines are the only South Americans to have ever been honoured with a Rolf Schock Prize.

The Argentine population benefits from a relatively high level of educational attainment, by regional standards. Among those age 20 and over, the highest level attained, per the 2010 Census, was distributed thus:

Characteristics
Education in Argentina has four levels and two different systems: initial level (kindergarten, educación inicial), primary level (educación primaria), secondary level (educación secundaria) and tertiary level (educación superior).

In some provinces, primary level is called educación primaria or EP (Spanish for "primary education") and comprises grades first to sixth. Secondary level, called educación secundaria or ES (Spanish for "secondary education") comprises grades first to sixth (called years). EP and ES are divided in two stages, called ciclos ("cycles"):

 EP: 1st, 2nd, 3rd, 4th, 5th and 6th school years
 ES: 1st, 2nd, 3rd, 4th, 5th and 6th school years

In some other provinces EP comprises grades first to seventh (the traditional system, established by Argentine law 1420/1884). ES comprises grades first to fifth (the traditional system, in use throughout the 20th century).

In both systems EP is mandatory to all students, as well as secondary education, according to the National Educational Law established in 2011.

The fourth stage is tertiary education, which includes both college and university education.

Education is funded by tax payers at all levels except for the majority of graduate studies. There are many private school institutions in the primary, secondary and university levels. Around 11.4 million people were enrolled in formal education of some kind in 2005:

1 excludes 185,776 teachers not classified by level

Qualification modes of grading

The scale to grade up the academic performance in students at most of the primary and secondary schools rests in the 1-10 ladder as is described in the following frame.

As of the start of the 2019 school year, in 16 out of 24 jurisdictions (23 provinces + the Autonomous City of Buenos Aires), 6 is the minimum passing grade, while in the others is 7.
In the University System however the scale can vary depending on the independent policies and statutes of grading of each independent Argentine University.

Primary education

Accepted between ages 6 and 14.
Primary education is the first EP cycle (grades 1–6). Because of the system that was in place during 1995–2007, most schools that offered 7 years of primary school prior to 1995 were forced to be converted and accept grades 8th and 9th, while others chose to eliminate 7th grade altogether, forcing students to complete the 3rd cycle in another institution.

Secondary education
Secondary education in Argentina comprises two levels. Years 1st to 3rd are common to all schools (Ciclo básico). Years 4th to 6th (in some provinces 4th to 5th) are organized in orientations (Ciclo orientado) such as Social Sciences, Natural Sciences, Arts, Sport, Design, etc. An additional year is offered in certain schools (Technical-Professional schools), which grants a professional title, also with orientations (agriculture, electricity, mechanics, construction, etc.).

In many provinces the secondary education system is still divided in three traditional large groups, "Bachiller" schools (very similar to grammar schools with a huge emphasis on humanistic studies), "Comercial" schools (focusing on economic sciences and everything related to it) and "Escuelas Técnicas" (with a focus on technical and scientific assignments, this one having the particularity of lasting six/seven years instead of five/six, it used to be called "Industrial") each one subdivided in more specific orientations related to its main branch.

In December 2006 the Chamber of Deputies of the Argentine Congress approved a new National Education Law restoring the old system of primary followed by secondary education, making secondary education obligatory and a right, and increasing the length of compulsory education to 12 years. The transitional period ended in 2011.

In addition an adult system of high schools (usually called Acelerados, Spanish for accelerated) exists in order to guarantee secondary education to people over 18. Normally it consists in 2 or 3 years of intensive program of study and it is provided by a large number of public and private schools varying on each province. Night shift is available in order to satisfy those who work during the day. These high school diplomas are accepted to enroll in a university.

Argentina's network of vocational schools, many under the auspices of the National Technological University (UTN) or the provincial educational systems, have historically given students viable alternatives, as well.

International education
As of January 2015, the International Schools Consultancy (ISC) listed Argentina as having 160 international schools. ISC defines an 'international school' in the following terms "ISC includes an international school if the school delivers a curriculum to any combination of pre-school, primary or secondary students, wholly or partly in English outside an English-speaking country, or if a school in a country where English is one of the official languages, offers an English-medium curriculum other than the country’s national curriculum and is international in its orientation." This definition is used by publications including The Economist.

Higher Education in Argentina

Argentine higher education system is based, since its conception during the colonial period, on the old and dogmatic Spanish higher education system, which is basically a Continental education system (opposed to the Anglo-Saxon Model). A historic event took place in the Reforma Universitaria de 1918, a highly-popular series of reforms that took place in the oldest university of the Country, the Universidad de Córdoba  that finally paved the way to the modernization of the Argentinian higher university systems as it is known nowadays. Since its foundation, it was focused on the teaching of Professions offering Professional degrees.

 Higher education institutes:  1- to 5-year degrees related to education or technical professions like Teachers, Professorship, Technicians.
 Universities: 4- to 7-years of professional education taught at universities offering many different degrees, such as Licentiate, Engineer's degree, Medic Title, Attorney Title, Professorships, Translation degrees, etc.
 Post-graduate degrees: This is a specialized and research-oriented education level. It is roughly divided in a first sub-level where a Specialist degree can be obtained in a 12–18 months period or Master's degree, requiring 24–30 months and an original research work and a higher sub-level where a Doctorate degree could be achieved.

Funding

One important aspect is that Public universities at tertiary education level and at university level are tuition-free and open to anyone. Although it is not required to pay any kind of fee at universities, hidden costs of education, like transportation and materials, are often neglected. The lack of a well-developed and widespread scholarship system makes it hard for students from low-income families to enroll in public universities: for each eight students from the 20% upper-income class, there is only one student from the 20% lower-income class. In contrast, post-graduate education requires some form of funding and it is generally not free.

Additionally, financial pressure to freshman college students force them to join the work force before graduation, thus it is very common for young students to have full-time jobs and at the same time study at the University. This is considered beneficial because when the students graduate they already have working experience, though this could also be one of the causes of the high ratio of dropouts.

College education

Argentina maintains a network of 39 National universities, financed by the Ministry of Education since 1946. Private and parochial universities are also abundant, numbering 46 among the active institutions and they enroll about a sixth of the collegiate student body (see University reform in Argentina and List of universities in Argentina).  Summing up, over 1.5 million students attend institutions of higher learning in Argentina, annually (roughly half the population of college age).

Argentina does not have a standard and common system of examination after high school, thus admission to universities is strictly defined by each university.  Moreover, a steady degradation in primary and secondary education created a huge difference between the required level to enter a university and the level achieved by the high school students. Some universities like University of Buenos Aires cope with this issue by creating a 1-year shared program called CBC that students need to complete in order to join the university.

Graduate school

The doctoral fields of study in Argentina are generally research-oriented doctoral studies, leading mostly to the awarding of the degrees of Doctor of Philosophy, Doctor of Science, Doctor of Medicine, and Doctor of Law, among others. Enrollment in doctorate programs in Argentina is available to candidates having earned a Licentiate, Professorships Engineer's degree or Master's degree in a related area of study.

Doctoral fields of study mostly pertain to one of five fields of knowledge:  Applied Sciences, Basic Sciences, Health Sciences, Human Sciences and Social Sciences. The doctoral studies offered by the Argentine universities include multiple fields and do have national and international validity of the degrees granted.

Academic regulations governing doctorates, and their corresponding fields, in Argentina prescribe that all graduate courses must be accredited by the National Commission for University Evaluation and Accreditation.  This entity stands as a public and decentralized body working under the jurisdiction of the Department of Education, Science and Technology. It administers the process of evaluation and accreditation for all doctorate programs, and is responsible for the institutional evaluation of all such programs at a national level. Graduate programs, including the Doctorados (PhDs), set standards per guidelines set forth by the Ministry of Science and Technology, together with the Universities Council.

Additionally, external evaluations of the doctoral programs are carried out by the National Commission for University Evaluation and Accreditation, or private entities created to that effect, together with the participation of academic peers. Argentine institutions of higher education provide further accreditation by international establishments to many of their courses of studies.

Universities

Public universities 
 Autonomous University of Entre Ríos
 University of Buenos Aires
 National University Arturo Jauretche
 National University of Avellaneda
 National University of Catamarca
 National University of Chilecito
 National University of Córdoba
 National University of Cuyo
 National University of Entre Ríos
 National University of Formosa
 National University of General San Martín
 National University of General Sarmiento
 National University of José C. Paz
 National University of Jujuy
 National University of La Matanza
 National University of La Pampa
 National University of Patagonia
 National University of Patagonia Austral
 National University of La Plata
 National University of La Rioja
 National University of Lanús
 National University of Lomas de Zamora
 National University of Luján
 National University of Mar del Plata
 National University of Misiones
 National University of Moreno
 National University of Quilmes
 National University of Río Cuarto
 National University of Río Negro
 National University of Rosario
 National University of Salta
 National University of San Juan
 National University of San Luis
 National University of Santiago del Estero
 National University of the South
 National University of Tierra del Fuego, Antarctica and South Atlantic Islands
 National University of Tres de Febrero
 National University of Tucumán
 National University of Villa María
 National University of Villa Mercedes
 National University of Central Buenos Aires
 National University of Austral Chaco
 National University of Comahue
 National University of Litoral
 National University of Noroeste of Buenos Aires
 National University of the Oeste
 National Technological University
 National University Of San Antonio De Areco

Private universities 

 Technological Institute of Buenos Aires
 University Institute of Health Sciences - HA Barceló Foundation
 H. A. Barceló Foundation
 Open Interamerican University
 Adventist University of Plata
 Argentina University of the Company
 Universidad Argentina John F. Kennedy
 Atlantis Argentina University
 Austral University (Argentina)
 University Blas Pascal
 Caece University
 Catholic University Argentina
 Catholic University of Córdoba
 Catholic University of Cuyo
 Catholic University of La Plata
 Catholic University of Parana
 Catholic University of Salta
 Catholic University of Santa Fe
 Catholic University of Santiago del Estero
 Champagnat University
 University of Belgrano
 CEMA University
 Universidad Argentina de la Empresa
 University of Business and Social Sciences
 University of Concepcion del Uruguay
 University of Congress
 University of Flores
 University of Cuenca del Plata
 University of the Fraternity of St. Thomas Aquino Groupings
 University of Merchant
 University of Mendoza
 University of Morón
 University of Palermo
 University of San Andrés
 University of San Isidro (USI)
 University of Sao Paulo (Tucuman)
 University of Aconcagua
 University of the Latin American Educational Center
 University of Cinema
 University of the Argentine Social Museum
 University of North St. Thomas Aquinas
 University of Salvador
 21st Century Business University
 University Favaloro
 University ISALUD
 Juan Agustín Maza University
 University Maimonides
 University Notarial Argentina
 Torcuato di Tella University

See also
 Academic ranks in Argentina
 University reform in Argentina
 Science and technology in Argentina
 Argentine University Federation
 List of universities in Argentina
 Domingo Faustino Sarmiento

References

External links

Ministerio de Educación / Argentina
Statistics and more statistics about education in Argentina
World Data on Education 2010/2011 - Argentina (International Bureau of Education / Unesco) 
Country Dossiers: Argentina (International Bureau of Education / Unesco) 
Academia Nacional de Educación / Argentina 
Dirección Nacional de Información y Evaluación de la Calidad Educativa (DINIECE)  (National Directorate for Information and Evaluation of Education Quality )
Comisión Nacional de Evaluación y Acreditación Universitaria (National Commission for University Evaluation and Accreditation)
Educational Research in Argentina, webdossier by the portal Education Worldwide (German Education Server)

 
Argentine culture